Dropephylla elegans is a species of rove beetles found in Europe.

References 

 Dropephylla elegans at biolob.cz

Beetles described in 1857
Omaliinae